Collis Mill is a Grade II* listed smock mill at Great Thurlow, Suffolk, England which has been restored.

History

Collis Mill was originally built at Slough, Berkshire. It was moved to Great Thurlow in 1807 replacing an earlier post mill. Thomas Hunt, the Soham millwright, carried out repairs to the mill in 1914. It ceased working by wind in 1915 and the sails were removed from 1920. The mill was worked by a portable steam engine until 1937. The derelict mill was capless in 1959 when it was purchased by R A Vestey for restoration as a visual amenity. Restoration was completed in 1962.

Description

Collis Mill is a three-storey smock mill on a single storey brick base. It has four Common sails and the pepperpot cap is winded by a fantail. It has two pairs of underdrift millstones.

Millers

Thomas Gardner 1841-44
Joseph Dearsley 1845-50
Elijah Dearsley 1850-75
Archibald Robinson 1875-
Gabriel Savage
Joseph Collis -1937
Reference for above:-

References

External links
Windmill World webpage on Collis Mill.

Windmills in Suffolk
Smock mills in England
Windmills completed in 1807
Grinding mills
Grade II* listed buildings in Suffolk
Grade II* listed windmills
Borough of St Edmundsbury